Rotisserie chicken is a chicken dish that is cooked on a rotisserie by using direct heat in which the chicken is placed next to the heat source. 

Electric- or gas-powered heating elements may be used by using adjustable infrared heat. These types of rotisseries have proven quite functional for cooking rotisserie-style chicken. Leftover rotisserie chicken may be used in a variety of dishes such as soup, chicken salad, and sandwiches.

Grocery loss leader
Rotisserie chickens are often sold at a lower price than raw whole chickens in grocery stores. Two explanations are often given to justify this phenomenon. First, some grocery stores may use rotisserie chickens as loss leaders to bring shoppers into the store. The logic behind this theory is that if customers come to a store for its rotisserie chickens, they will buy other products while they are there, too. Second, rotisserie chickens are often made with poultry that is about to reach its "best by" date. By cooking and selling the chickens, the grocery stores are able to recoup some of their expenditures.

By region

United States 
In the United States, ready-to-eat rotisserie chickens were available in supermarkets and some butcher shops during much of the twentieth century. However, they did not become a widely available option for consumers until the early 1990s, when Boston Market helped popularize the selling of packaged rotisserie chickens.

Rotisserie chickens are now highly popular. In 2010, 600 million rotisserie-cooked chickens were purchased by consumers "in U.S. supermarkets, club stores and similar retail outlets." In 2018, over 900 million rotisserie chickens were sold by foodservice outlets and retail stores.

In the U.S., chickens used for rotisserie cooking may be injected with brine to retain moisture. Additional ingredients may be used to add flavor and to brown the chicken, such as oleoresin, yeast extract, sodium tripolyphosphate, and natural flavorings.

Costco and rotisserie chickens
Costco is one of the largest producers and vendors of rotisserie chickens in the United States, with one commentator describing it as "the undisputed king of rotisserie chickens." In 2017, Costco sold approximately 87 million rotisserie chickens in the United States. Costco's CFO, Richard Galanti, has repeatedly rebuffed suggestions that Costco might eventually increase the cost of its chickens above $4.99, which has been the price of a Costco rotisserie chicken since 2009. 

In 2017, Costco broke ground on a new 414-acre facility in Fremont, Nebraska that would include a hatchery, feed mill, and processing plant. The facility – which is expected to produce around 100 million chickens per year, or roughly 40 percent of Costco's needs – has been reported as costing between $275 million and $400 million. The plant is scheduled to open in September 2019.

Internet celebrities
In 2022, Alexander Tominsky, a waiter in Philadelphia, became a local celebrity after eating a rotisserie chicken every day for 40 consecutive days.

Also in 2022, Spanish-speaking TikTok user @donpollo2982 gained notoriety in June after sharing videos of him eating food in his car, usually rotisserie chicken, while often being interrupted by sounds emitted from his Android smartphone.

Australia 
The two major supermarkets, Coles and Woolworths, both sell chickens cooked in large ovens. A common variation on the local fish and chip shop is one that also sells charcoal chicken, rotated and cooked above charcoal.

Canada 
Rotisserie chicken has been a popular food in Canada since the 1950s, and is a staple of Canadian pop culture. 

Two Canadian casual dining restaurant chains, Swiss Chalet and St-Hubert dominate the market for chicken, though the dish is also the central item for other Canadian chains, popular international chains such as Nandos,  or individual restaurants. Swiss Chalet owns a cable channel that exclusively airs content related to rotisserie chicken, "twenty-four hours a day, seven days a week." It typically airs chickens rotating on a rotisserie. Occasionally, a dancing man appears wearing a costume that looks "like a container of Swiss Chalet's dipping sauce."

Most Canadian supermarket chains (including Costco) sell rotisserie chicken as a loss leader, similar to supermarkets in the United States.

France 
Napoleon Bonaparte was a frequent consumer of rotisserie chickens.

Mexico 
In Mexico, rotisserie chicken is called "pollo asado" or "pollo rostizado" (which literally mean "grilled chicken" and "roasted chicken" respectively). Rotisserie chicken is often sold at restaurants specializing in rotisserie chicken and is eaten with tortillas, salsa, and sides of arroz rojo and refried beans; it can also be found at supermarkets or warehouse clubs such as Costco or Sam's Club.

Peru 

Known in Peru as pollo a la brasa (literally "roasted chicken"), it is considered a national dish of the country, with Peruvians consuming it an average of three times per month and with rotisserie chicken restaurants accounting for 40% of the fast food industry in the country.  Peruvian-style rotisserie chicken has been growing in popularity worldwide, especially in the United States, where a large number of such restaurants have opened in the past two decades.

Gallery

See also

 Barbecue chicken
 Beer can chicken
 Chicken restaurant
 List of chicken restaurants
 Huli-huli chicken
 List of chicken dishes
 List of spit-roasted foods
Siu mei

References

Citations

Sources 
 Adler, Karen; Fertig, Judith M. (2005).The Barbecue Queens' Big Book of Barbecue. Harvard Common Press. p. 217. 
 Raichlen, Steven (2001). How to Grill: The Complete Illustrated Book of Barbecue Techniques, a Barbecue Bible! Cookbook. Workman Publishing.

Further reading

American chicken dishes
Canadian chicken dishes
Spit-cooked foods